Yemişli is a village in the Uludere District of Şırnak Province in Turkey. The village is populated by Kurds of the Goyan tribe and had a population of 2,405 in 2021.

The hamlet of Yekmal is attached to Yemişli.

History
Margā (today called Yemişli) was inhabited by 760 Chaldean Catholic Assyrians in 1913 and had one church and one priest as part of the diocese of Zakho. The village was destroyed by the Ottoman Army in June 1915 amidst the Sayfo and its inhabitants were later resettled at Berseve near Zakho in Iraq.

References

Bibliography

Villages in Uludere District
Kurdish settlements in Şırnak Province
Historic Assyrian communities in Turkey
Places of the Assyrian genocide